Schießbach may refer to:

Schießbach (Bühler), a river of Baden-Württemberg, Germany, tributary of the Bühler
Schießbach (Nagold), a river of Baden-Württemberg, Germany, tributary of the Nagold
Schießbach (Saale), a river of Bavaria, Germany, tributary of the Saale